The Leader of the House in Lok Sabha is the parliamentary chairperson of the party that holds a majority in the Lok Sabha and is responsible for government business in the house. The office holder is usually the prime minister if they are a member of the chamber. However, if the prime minister is not a member of the Lok Sabha, they can appoint the Leader of the House.

List

Deputy leader of House                
 Rajnath Singh - since  26 May 2014

See also
Speaker of the Lok Sabha
Deputy Speaker of the Lok Sabha
Leader of the House in Rajya Sabha
Leader of the Opposition in Lok Sabha
Leader of the Opposition in Rajya Sabha
Secretary General of the Lok Sabha

Notes

References

Lok Sabha
Lists of political office-holders in India
Lists of members of the Lok Sabha
Leaders of the Lok Sabha